Arthur Ginter (born 20 May 1898, date of death unknown) was a Luxembourgian footballer. He played in three matches for the Luxembourg national football team in 1924.

References

External links

1898 births
Year of death missing
Luxembourgian footballers
Luxembourg international footballers
Place of birth missing
Association football defenders
CS Fola Esch players